The Micronesian records in swimming are the fastest ever performances of swimmers from the Federated States of Micronesia, which are recognised and ratified by the Federated States of Micronesia Swimming Association.

All records were set in finals unless noted otherwise.

Long Course (50 m)

Men

Women

Mixed relay

Short Course (25 m)

Men

Women

References

Micronesia
Records
Swimming
Swimming